Tiw may refer to:

Tiw (god), an Incan god
 Týr, a god of Germanic mythology, spelled Tiw in Old English
Telesystems International Wireless, a Canadian global mobile communications operator
Tropical instability waves, a westward-propagating wave
Tiw Valley, named after the Norse god Týr
Tactical Imagery-Intelligence Wing, responsible for the processing of fast-jet electro-optic imagery
Tin Wan station, by MTR station code
Tacoma Narrows Airport, by IATA code
Transcarga, a cargo airline from Venezuela, by ICAO code
Titanium Tungsten (TiW), a titanium alloy used in the semiconductor industry